Richard Henry Jones (3 November 1916 – 14 July 2004) was an English cricketer.  Jones was a left-handed batsman who bowled right-arm medium pace.  He was born at Redditch, Worcestershire.  He was known later in life as Richard Henry Cartwright-Jones.

Jones made a single first-class appearance for Warwickshire against Somerset at Edgbaston in the 1946 County Championship.  Opening the bowling in Somerset's first-innings, he bowled eight wicketless overs, though conceded just 12 runs from them.  He opened the batting in Warwickshire's first-innings and was dismissed for 9 runs by Johnny Lawrence, while in Somerset's second-innings he again opened the bowling, bowling three wicketless overs which cost 15 runs.  He scored 23 runs in Warwickshire's second-innings, before he was dismissed by Arthur Wellard, with Warwickshire winning by 2 wickets.

He died at Cleobury Mortimer, Shropshire on 14 July 2004.

References

External links
Richard Jones at ESPNcricinfo
Richard Jones at CricketArchive

1916 births
2004 deaths
Sportspeople from Redditch
English cricketers
Warwickshire cricketers